Robert E. Shore-Goss is a theologian and author.

Goss was brought up in a devout Roman Catholic family and felt called to the priesthood, being ordained as a Jesuit in 1976. He left the Jesuits in 1978 going on to receive a Th.D. in Comparative Religion from Harvard University.

Goss taught in the Religious Studies Department of Webster University (1994–2004), and served as chair of the department. His denial of tenure by the university was controversial with allegations by Goss that this was due to his outspoken views on sexuality.  Webster Pride, the student organization for gay, lesbian, bisexual and transgender rights, did not take an official stance.  Webster Pride's president was quoted in the student newspaper as not opposed to the decision "because she doesn't believe the decision had anything to do with homophobia."

He has been involved in gay organizations such as ACT UP, Queer Nation, and the gay Roman Catholic group DignityUSA. Goss has served as co-chair of the Gay Men's Issues in Religion Group of the American Academy of Religion. He serves on the National Advisory Board of the Center for Lesbian and Gay Studies in Religion and Ministry of the Pacific School of Religion. He married for the second time in 2009.

Works

His published works include:
 Jesus ACTED UP: A Gay and Lesbian Manifesto 1993, San Francisco, CA: HarperCollins
 Take Back the Word: A Queer Reading of the Bible 2000 (co-edited with West, Mona), Cleveland, OH: Pilgrim Press
 Queering Christ: Beyond Jesus ACTED UP 2002, Cleveland, OH: Pilgrim Press
 Gay Catholic Priests and Clerical Sexual Misconduct: Breaking the Silence of Sodom 2005 (co-edited with Boisvert, Donald), New York, NY: Haworth Press
 The Queer Bible Commentary 2006 (co-edited with Bohache, Thomas; Guest, Deryn; West, Mona), London: SCM-Canterbury Press
 Queering Christianity: Finding a Place at the Table for LGBTQI Christians 2013 (co-edited with Bohache, Thomas; Cheng, Patrick S.; West, Mona), Santa Barbara, CA: ABC-CLIO

Shore-Goss is currently an adjunct faculty member at Claremont School of Theology.

References

External links 
 Bio of Rev Dr Goss from webpage of MCC in the Valley - the Church he pastors

American gay writers
LGBT Protestant clergy
American LGBT rights activists
Liberation theologians
Harvard Divinity School alumni
Webster University faculty
Metropolitan Community Church clergy
Queer theologians
Former Jesuits
Living people
Converts to Protestantism from Roman Catholicism
Year of birth missing (living people)